Kim Tae-eun (born 21 September 1989) is a South Korean footballer who plays as a full-back for Pocheon Citizen FC.

Career
Kim Tae-eun was selected by Incheon United in 2011 K League draft.

In July 2015, he signed with Seoul E-Land after a four-year spell in Korea National League.

References

External links 
 

1989 births
Living people
Association football fullbacks
South Korean footballers
Incheon United FC players
Daejeon Korail FC players
Seoul E-Land FC players
Daejeon Hana Citizen FC players
K League 2 players
Korea National League players